Mefou Park, also known as Mefou Wildlife Sanctuary and Mfou Reserve, is a primate sanctuary in the forested area of Mfou in Cameroon. Within it, Mefou Primate Park is used as a shelter for primates that are native to Africa: the monkey, chimpanzees and gorillas.

History 
Ape Action Africa established the sanctuary to house primates which were housed at the Mvog-Betsi Zoo at Yaoundé. Eventually, it would act to protect primates that were affected by illegal pet and bushmeat trades in the country.

In 2010, the sanctuary's director, Colonel Avi Sivan, was killed in a helicopter crash.

Gallery

See also 
 Mpem and Djim National Park
 Tourism in Cameroon
 Wildlife of Cameroon

References

Further reading 
 Martin Cheek, Yvette Harvey, Jean-Michel Onana (dir.), Phyllanthus kidna Challen & Petra Hoffm., in The Plants of Mefou Proposed National Park, Central Province, Cameroon: A Conservation Checklist, Kew Publishing, 2010,

External links 
 Mefou Primate Sanctuary
 Mefou National Park, Yaounde, Cameroon: Primate Park (YouTube)
 Cameroon Wildlife Sanctuary and Wildlife Refuge: Mefou and Ape Action Africa
 Mefou National Park Gorilla
 Parc de la Méfou Cameroun (in the French language)

National parks of Cameroon
Centre Region (Cameroon)